Amanti miei (literally: My Lovers, internationally released as Cindy's Love Games, Tight Fit and Barbara's Escapades) is a 1979 Italian commedia sexy all'italiana film directed by Aldo Grimaldi.

Plot 
Barbara, a beautiful young woman, is engaged and in love with Sergio, but she accidentally discovers his constant betrayals and decides to take revenge.

Cast 
 Cindy Leadbetter as Barbara
 Vassili Karis as  Sergio
 Annamaria Clementi   
 Maurice Poli
 Carlo De Mejo

References

External links

1979 films
Commedia sexy all'italiana
Films directed by Aldo Grimaldi
1970s sex comedy films
Films scored by Fabio Frizzi
1979 comedy films
1970s Italian films
1970s Italian-language films